Simpsonichthys constanciae is a species of killifish from the family Rivulidae that is endemic to Brazil. It is restricted to temporary freshwater habitats (like ponds) in the São João basin in Rio de Janeiro, while all other species in the genus are from Bahia.

Etymology
The specific name of this fish honours Constance White, an American watercolour painter, who collected type of this fish with her husband, Lieutenant colonel Thomas D. White, and created colour sketches for George S. Myers.

References 

constanciae
Taxa named by George S. Myers
Fish described in 1942